Hilton Park was a multi-purpose stadium in Leigh, Greater Manchester, England. It was the home of Leigh RLFC rugby league club and Leigh Genesis football club. It had a capacity of approximately 10,000.

The stadium was demolished in February 2009.

History
In 1947, Leigh Rugby League Club moved to new headquarters in Kirkhall Lane, having played at Mather Lane before the Second World War and at Madeley Park (Leigh Harriers Athletic ground) immediately after the war.

In 1953, floodlights were installed at a cost of £4,100. The ground saw a record home crowd of 31,326 attend a Rugby League Challenge Cup tie with St. Helens in the same year. Later, Kirkhall Lane was officially renamed Hilton Park after former club chairman Jack Hilton in recognition of his work in securing the site for the new ground.

Leigh's record attendance for rugby was set in 1953 at 31,326 when St Helens visited for a third round Challenge Cup game. The largest modern-day attendance saw 9,760 watch a Challenge Cup Quarter Final against local rivals Wigan in 2002.

In 1995, the association football club Horwich RMI moved from the Grundy Hill stadium, in Horwich to Hilton Park, changing its name to Leigh RMI in the process. As part of the deal a new company, Grundy Hill Estates, was formed to take over the ownership of the ground.

Leigh added Centurions to its name for the 1995–96 season, and as part of the name change the stadium was renamed the Coliseum.

Leigh moved to Leigh Sports Village for the 2009–10 season. Hilton Park has since been demolished with a housing development being built on the site.

Rugby League Test Matches
The list of international rugby league matches played at Hilton Park is.

* This match, played a week after the 1954 Rugby League World Cup Final, was played in very muddy conditions and saw both teams come out in different coloured jumpers after half time. Australia wore red and New Zealand wore blue.

Rugby League Tour Matches
Hilton Park also saw Leigh and an English League XIII select side play host to international touring teams from Australia and New Zealand from 1948 to 1982.

References

External links
Hilton Park - Leigh

Defunct rugby league venues in England
Defunct sports venues in Greater Manchester
Defunct football venues in England
Leigh Genesis F.C.
Multi-purpose stadiums in the United Kingdom
Sport in the Metropolitan Borough of Wigan
Sports venues completed in 1947
Sports venues demolished in 2009
Buildings and structures in Leigh, Greater Manchester
Leigh Leopards
Demolished sports venues in the United Kingdom